Marylhurst, Oregon is the location of a U.S. Post Office, ZIP Code 97036, in southern Lake Oswego, Oregon on the campus of Marylhurst University (closed in 2018).

Marylhurst, more commonly accepted, is the name of a neighborhood within the city of West Linn, Oregon southwest to the campus and is also the name of a residential development across from the campus, which officially is part of the Glenmorrie neighborhood of Lake Oswego, Oregon. It is located approximately eight miles south of Portland on Oregon Route 43 near the Willamette River.

References

Populated places established in the 1890s
Portland metropolitan area
Unincorporated communities in Clackamas County, Oregon
1890s establishments in Oregon